Eugenia pustulescens is a species of plant in the family Myrtaceae. It is endemic to Ecuador.

References

Endemic flora of Ecuador
pustulescens
Endangered plants
Taxonomy articles created by Polbot